Harry Singh Arora (born December 16, 1969) is an Indian-born American politician currently serving as a member of the Connecticut House of Representatives from the 151st District, serving since 2020. In 2018, Arora ran against incumbent Jim Himes in the race for Connecticut's Fourth District in the United States House of Representatives. He was the Republican nominee for Connecticut State Treasurer in the 2022 election.

Early life and education 
Arora was born December 16, 1969 in New Delhi, India. He completed his Bachelor of Engineering at Delhi College of Engineering. He came to Austin, Texas, to complete a Master of Business Administration in Finance in 1992. Arora has also completed a Master of Public Administration at the Harvard Kennedy School. He became a naturalized U.S. citizen in 2004.

Professional career 
Arora has been a partner in London-based commodity trading firm Northlander Commodity Advisors, LLP  which specializes in energy trading. In 2006, he started his own fund in Greenwich, named ARCIM Advisors (which now is called Alphastrat, LLC). He is a independent investment manager with a 25-year track record in finance.

Political career

2018 United States House of Representatives election
In 2018, Arora challenged incumbent U.S. Representative Jim Himes for Connecticut's Fourth District seat in the United States House of Representatives. Arora would later lose the election by nearly 23 points.

Connecticut House of Representatives
Arora was first elected to the House in a special election on January 21, 2020. Arora was re-elected in that November's general election against Democrat Hector Arzeno. He currently serves as Vice-Chair of the Labor and Public Employees Committee.

On April 13, 2022, Arora announced that he was running for Connecticut State Treasurer, and on May 6, 2022 was chosen as the Republican nominee for the State Treasurer election. He lost the general election to Erick Russell.

Family 
Arora is married to Nisha Arora (b. 1977), who is currently serving as a member of the Greenwich Board of Estimate and Taxation (BET), also for the Republican Party. They have three children and reside in the Midcountry section of Greenwich, Connecticut.

References

1969 births
Living people
Members of the Connecticut House of Representatives
Place of birth missing (living people)
Delhi Technological University alumni
McCombs School of Business alumni
Harvard Kennedy School alumni
Connecticut Republican primaries
American politicians of Indian descent
Asian conservatism in the United States